White Clay is  a populated place in Apache County, Arizona, United States.

Notes

Populated places in Apache County, Arizona
Unincorporated communities in Arizona